Tjaart Marais was a South African rugby fly-half and still played in the era when rugby was an amateur sport.

Education

Marais was born on 21 July 1961. He matriculated on Potchefstroom Gimnasium and went on to complete his undergraduate studies at the Potchefstroom University for Christian Higher Education. He only has sight in one eye.

Rugby records

Marais played rugby for Western Transvaal and later for Northern Transvaal from 1980-1990

His records are:
Currie Cup points 703
Overall points in his career 1150
Currie Cup Points in a season -168 in 1988
Overall points in a season -271 in 1988
Most points in a game 31 – for Western Transvaal against East Free State
Try conversions in a game 14 - for Western Transvaal against East Free State

References 

Leopards (rugby union) players
North-West University alumni
Rugby union fly-halves
South African rugby union players
1961 births
Living people